George Mann MacBeth (19 January 1932 – 16 February 1992) was a Scottish poet and novelist.

Biography
George MacBeth was born in Shotts, Lanarkshire, Scotland. When he was three, his family moved to Sheffield in England. He was educated in Sheffield at King Edward VII School where he was Head Prefect in 1951 (photo), before going up to New College, Oxford, with an Open Scholarship in Classics.

He joined BBC Radio on graduating in 1955 from the University of Oxford. He worked there, as a producer of programmes on poetry, notably for the BBC Third Programme, until 1976.  He was a member of The Group.

He resigned from the BBC to take up novel-writing; he introduced a series of thrillers involving the spy, Cadbury.  In his later post-BBC years, after divorcing his first wife, he married the novelist Lisa St Aubin de Terán, with whom he had a child, Alexander Morton George MacBeth. After a divorce, he moved with his new wife, Penny, to Ireland to live at Moyne Park, Abbeyknockmoy, near Tuam in County Galway. A few months later, George MacBeth was diagnosed as suffering from motor neurone disease, of which he died in early 1992. In the last poetry he wrote, MacBeth provides an anatomy of a cruel disease and the destruction it caused two people deeply in love. Penny and George had two children, Diana ("Lally") Francesca Ronchetti MacBeth and George Edward Morton Mann MacBeth.

Poems from Oby (1982) was a Choice of the Poetry Book Society. He wrote the compilation whilst living at The Old Rectory, Oby; Oby is a Norfolk hamlet.  He received a  Geoffrey Faber Memorial Prize for his work.

MacBeth died in Tuam, County Galway, Ireland.

Works

Poetry

A Form of Words (1954)
Lecture to the Trainees (1962)
The Broken Places (1963)
A Doomsday Book: Poems and Poem-games (1965)
Missile Commander (1965)
The Calf (1965)
The Twelve Hotels (1965)
The Colour of Blood (1967)
The Screens (1967)
A Death (1969)
A War Quartet (1969)
Night of Stones (1969)
The Burning Cone (1970)
Poems (1970)
The Bamboo Nightingale (1970)
The Hiroshima Dream (1970)
The Snow Leopard (1970)
Two Poems (1970)
A Prayer Against Revenge (1971)
The Orlando Poems (1971)
Collected Poems 1958–1970 (1972)
A Farewell (1972)
A Litany (1972)
Lusus: A Verse Lecture (1972)
Shrapnel (1972)
Prayers (1973)
A Poet's Year (1973)
The Vision (1973)
Elegy for the Gas Dowsers (1974)
In the Hours Waiting for Blood to Come (1975)
The Journey to the Island (1975)
Last Night (1976)
Buying a Heart (1978)
The Saddled Man (1978)
Poem for Breathing (1979)
Poems of Love and Death (1980)
Typing a Novel About the War (1980)
Poems from Oby (1982)
The Long Darkness (1983)
The Cleaver Garden (1986)
 Anatomy of Divorce (1988)
 Collected Poems, 1958–1982 (1989)
 Trespassing: Poems from Ireland (1991)
 The Patient (1992)
 Selected Poems (2002), edited by Anthony Thwaite

Novels

The Transformation (1975)
The Samurai (1976), also published as Cadbury and the Samurai
The Survivor (1977)
The Seven Witches (1978), also published as Cadbury and the Seven Witches
The Born Losers (1982), also published as Cadbury and the Born Losers
The Katana: A Novel Based on the War Diaries of John Beeby (1982), also published as A Kind of Treason
Anna's Book (1983)
The Lion of Pescara (1984)
 Another Love Story (1991)
 The Testament of Spencer (1992)

As Editor

Penguin Book of Sick Verse (1963)
Penguin Modern Poets 6 (1964) with Jack Clemo and Edward Lucie-Smith
Penguin Book of Animal Verse (1965)
Poetry 1900 to 1965 (1967)
The Penguin Book of Victorian Verse (1969) 
The Falling Splendour, Poems of Alfred Lord Tennyson (1970)
Free Form Poetry Two (1971), with Bob Cobbing
The Book of Cats (1976), editor with Martin Booth
Poetry 1900–75 (1980), anthology, editor
Facts and Feelings in the Classroom (1983), editor with Martin Booth

Books for Children

Noah's Journey (1966)
Jonah and the Lord (1970)
Noah and the Lord (1970)
The Rectory Mice (1982)
The Story of Daniel (1986)

Non-Fiction

My Scotland: Fragments of a State of Mind (1973)
Dizzy's Woman (1986)
 A Child of the War (1987)

Short Fiction

Crab Apple Crisis (New Worlds, October 1966)

Drama

The Humming Birds: A Monodrama (1968)

References

External links
 Book Rags
Materials related to MacBeth can be found in the Turret Books records at the University of Maryland Libraries

Scottish novelists
People educated at King Edward VII School, Sheffield
Alumni of New College, Oxford
1932 births
1992 deaths
People from Shotts
20th-century British novelists
20th-century Scottish poets
Scottish male poets
20th-century British male writers